Intracerebroventricular injection (also called ICV injection, i.c.v. injection, or sometimes ICVI) is an invasive injection technique of substances directly into the cerebrospinal fluid in cerebral ventricles in order to bypass the bloodbrain barrier. Although this barrier effectively protects the brain, it can prevent important medications from entering the CNS. The technique is widely used in biomedical research to introduce drugs, therapeutic RNAs, plasmid DNAs, and viral vectors into the CNS of diseased mice models. It can also be used in human in cases of neurodegenerative disorders like spinal muscular atrophy (SMA), or administering chemotherapy in gliomas as well as delivering neurotrophic factors to CNS. It can be contrasted with intraperitoneal injection as an alternative choice of route of administration with differing pharmacokinetic and pharmacodynamic effects.

The Ommaya reservoir is a catheter system invented by Ayub Ommaya, a Pakistani neurosurgeon in 1963. The reservoir is implanted under the scalp and attached to a catheter which is intracerebroventricularly inserted into the lateral ventricle.

References

Medical treatments
Routes of administration
Injection (medicine)
Ventricular system